The following is a list of California State University online and FCC-licensed radio stations.

 Coyote Radio (California State University – San Bernardino) student-run online radio station
 Dolphin Radio (California State University – Channel Islands) official student-run online radio station
 KAZU (California State University – Monterey Bay)
 KCHO (FM) (California State University – Chico)
 KCPK (California State Polytechnic University, Pomona, CA) FM, then carrier-current AM for dorms in late 1960s to 1970s.
 KCPP (California Poly University – Pomona) online radio station student club
 KCR (San Diego State University)
 KCPR (Cal Poly at San Luis Obispo)
 KCSN (California State University – Northridge)
 KCSS (California State University Stanislaus)
 KFSR (California State University – Fresno)
 KKJZ (California State University – Long Beach)
 K-Beach Radio (California State University – Long Beach) Student Union run, online radio station
 22 West Radio (California State University – Long Beach) Student Union run, online radio station
 KHSM (Cal Poly Humboldt)
 KHSQ (Cal Poly Humboldt)
 KHSU (Cal Poly Humboldt)
 KPBS-FM (San Diego State University)
 KRFH-LP (Cal Poly Humboldt)
 KSFS (San Francisco State University)
 KSJS (San Jose State University)
 KSSU (AM) (California State University – Sacramento)
 KXJZ (California State University – Sacramento)
 KXPR (California State University – Sacramento)
 KUOP (California State University – Sacramento)

References 

California State University
CPR
Mass media in California
CPR